Ron Butlin (born 1949 in Edinburgh) is a Scottish poet and novelist who was Edinburgh Makar (Poet Laureate) from 2008 to 2014.

Education
Butlin was educated at the University of Edinburgh. He later became writer in residence in 1982 and 1984 at the university.

Bibliography
He has written several novels, collections of short stories, poems and plays. His work has been widely anthologised in Britain and abroad, and translated into over a dozen languages. His debut novel, The Sound Of My Voice, was republished in 2002 with an introduction by Irvine Welsh who called it “one of the greatest pieces of fiction to come out of Britain in the Eighties”.

Butlin is married to the Scottish-Swiss novelist and short story writer Regi Claire.

Opera Libretto
He has written seven libretti for opera, mostly for Scottish Opera, and frequently in collaboration with composer Lyell Cresswell.

Bibliography
Novels
 The Sound of My Voice (1987)
 Night Visits (1997)
 Belonging (2006)
 Ghost Moon (2014)

Short Story Collections
 The Tilting Room (1983)
 Vivaldi and the Number 3 and Other Impossible Stories (2004)
 No More Angels (2007)

Poetry
 The Wonnerfuu Warld o John Milton (1974)
 Stretto (1976)
 Creatures Tamed by Cruelty (1979)
 The Exquisite Instrument: Imitations from the Chinese (1982)
 Ragtime in Unforgettable Bars (1985)
 Histories of Desire (1995)
 Without a Backward Glance (2005)
 The Magicians of Edinburgh (2012)
 The Magicians of Scotland (2015)
 Here Come the Trolls! (verse for children, 2015)
 The Offering (2017)

Reviews
 Murray, Glen (1980), review of Creatures Claimed by Cruelty, in Cencrastus No. 2, Spring 1980, pp. 43 – 45
 Holton, Brian (1983), review of The Exquisite Instrument, in Hearn, Sheila G. (ed.), Cencrastus No. 11, New Year 1983, p. 43, 

Opera

 Markheim
 Dark Kingdom
 Faraway Pictures
 Good Angel, Bad Angel
 The Perfect Woman
 The Money Man
 Wedlock

References

1949 births
Living people
Scottish poets
Scottish novelists
Scottish science fiction writers
Scottish short story writers
Scottish opera librettists
Scottish dramatists and playwrights